Trick or Treehouse can refer to:

Television 
 "Trick or Treehouse (8 Simple Rules)", an episode of 8 Simple Rules
 "Trick or Treehouse (Dexter's Laboratory)", an episode of Dexter's Laboratory